Jaitpura is a village in the Pali district of Rajasthan, India. It is located in the Marwar Junction tehsil of Pali.

References

Villages in Pali district